This page provides the summary of the second round qualifiers for the group stage of the Asian football qualifiers for 2012 Olympics. The matches in this round were held on 19 June 2011 (first leg) and 23 June 2011 (second leg).

Seeding for the draw 
12 teams have been seeded and 12 unseeded on the basis of ranking of Asian qualifiers and final round of 2008 Beijing Olympics men’s football tournament. The draw was held on 30 March 2011 in AFC House.

{| class="wikitable"
|-
! Seeded Teams
! Unseeded Teams
|-
|valign=top|

    

|valign=top|

    

|}

Matches

First leg

Second leg 

Qatar won 4–2 on aggregate.

Iraq won 5-0 on aggregate due to Iran using a banned player during the first match.

2–2 on aggregate. Bahrain won on the away goals rule.

Australia won 7–0 on aggregate.

Japan won 4–3 on aggregate.

Syria won 6–2 on aggregate.

United Arab Emirates won 2–1 on aggregate.

South Korea won 4–2 on aggregate.

Uzbekistan won 3–0 on aggregate.

Saudi Arabia won 6–1 on aggregate.

Oman won 4–1 on aggregate.

Malaysia won 2–1 on aggregate.

References 

2